Lee Seung-ho is the name of:

 Lee Seung-ho (baseball, born 1976), South Korean baseball player
 Lee Seung-ho (baseball, born 1981), South Korean baseball player
 Lee Seong-ho, represented South Korea at the 2007 World Cup (men's golf)
 Lee Seung-ho (actor), South Korean actor and model